Steven Robert Comisar (born December 30, 1961) is an American convicted con man and extortionist.  Comisar was in federal prison and was released April 27, 2018.

Career 
Comisar grew up in Beverly Hills, California.  As a young man he sold a "solar powered clothes dryer" in national magazines for $49.95. Buyers received a length of clothesline. Comisar has been arrested and convicted of numerous crimes. Comisar was convicted of a variety of frauds in 1983, 1990, 1994 and 1999. All these trials took place in Federal court in Los Angeles. In 1999, Comisar was arrested for swindling investors in a fake television quiz show involving Joe Namath. He was sentenced to thirty-three months in jail.

Comisar used the working name Brett Champion during the period when he said he had retired from his career as a con man and posed as a fraud prevention expert and consultant, using it on Dateline NBC, The View, Sally, Leeza, Crook & Chase, and in various other television appearances, and when he wrote the book America's Guide to Fraud Prevention. Comisar is now prohibited from using this alias or from referring to himself as a consumer fraud expert. His book is considered a "piece of fraud history" by the Association of Certified Fraud Examiners and is on display in their fraud museum.

References 

1961 births
Living people
American male writers
American prisoners and detainees
American people convicted of fraud
American confidence tricksters
People from Beverly Hills, California
21st-century American writers